Po'Girl is the self-titled debut album by the Canadian group Po' Girl. It was released June 10, 2003. It was released in the United States on August 28, on HighTone Records, and in Europe on January 26, 2004 on Cadiz Music. Po' Girl on this album was Trish Klein and Allison Russell.

Track listing

Gone In Pawn (Shake Sugaree) (Elizabeth Cotton, add. lyrics Allison Russell) 3:26
Bad Luck Day Baby (Allison Russell, Trish Klein) 3:05
City Song (Trish Klein) 4:52
Bleak St (Allison Russell, Trish Klein, with add. lyrics from Tom Waits) 3:33
Shameless (Trish Klein) 3:28
Malaise Days (Allison Russell, Trish Klein) 4:44
Cold Hungry Blues (Allison Russell, Trish Klein) 3:00
Backstairs Down (Trish Klein) 3:22
Abilene (Lester Brown, arr. Po' Girl) 3:39
Wheels Are Taking Me Away (Trish Klein) 4:14
What Sad Old Song? (Allison Russell, Trish Klein) 6:02
Lullabye (Allison Russell, Trish Klein) 2:32

Personnel

Trish Klein – Vocals, acoustic and electric guitar, banjo, harmonica (3)
Allison Russell – Vocals, clarinet, pennywhistle, whistling
Kenton Loewen – Percussion
Roey Shemesh – Acoustic stand-up bass
Frazey Ford – Harmonies (8 & 11)
Anna Lumiere – Hammond, rhodes, wurlitzer (2 & 8)
Les Mersa – Chromatic harmonica (1 & 9)
Cr Avery – Beatboxing, harmonica (4)
Marc L'Espérance – Harmonies (11)
Jesse Zubot – Fiddle (5)

External links
Official lyrics

Po' Girl albums
2003 albums